Daughters of Charity of the Sacred Heart of Jesus  (Filles de la Charité du Sacré-Coeur de Jésus; F.C.S.C.J.) is a congregation established on 18 December 1823 in France by Jean-Maurice Catroux (3 October 1794 – 16 April 1863) and Rose Giet (3 December 1784 – 3 January 1848). The sisters serve in nine countries as  educators, health care workers, and pastoral care ministers.

History
Jean-Maurice Catroux was born 3 October 1794 and ordained a priest 19 December 1818. He became pastor at La Salle-de-Vihiers on 28 December 1820. Rose Giet was born 3 December 1784. She agreed to take charge of the education of children. Other young women joined her to educate the young and care for the sick. On 18 December 1823, the day the congregation marks as its founding, Giet became a professed religious, taking the name Sister Marie. Their work spread to other parishes Anjou, of Poitou and the area of Nantes.

The Congregation developed rapidly until 1902 when the French government expelled religious from the schools. Some took up secular garb, some left France. In 1905, four sisters arrived in Newport, Vermont. In 1911, Bishop Paul LaRocque created a Canadian novitiate in Sherbrooke, Quebec.

In 1960, the Daughters of Charity of the Sacred Heart of Jesus established a novitiate in Littleton, New Hampshire. Ten years later, the building became an extended care facility. It also houses the central administration for Sacred Heart for New England, New York and Louisiana. In the Roman Catholic Diocese of Ogdensburg, they serve in Plattsburg.

They also have a presence is the Roman Catholic Archdiocese of Durban.

References

External links
 OfficIal website

Catholic female orders and societies
Religious organizations established in 1848
1848 establishments in France